Elections in Vietnam occur under a single-party political system of the Vietnamese Communist Party (VCP). Vietnam is among the few contemporary party-led dictatorships to not hold any direct elections at the national level. The competitive nature of the elections is highly constrained by the Communist Party's monopoly on power in Vietnam, limitations on free speech, and government interference with the elections.

General
The President of Vietnam (Chủ tịch nước) is elected by the National Assembly, thus an indirect system. The Prime Minister of Vietnam (Thủ tướng) and Chief Justice (Chánh án Tối cao) of Vietnam are appointed by the President and approved by the National Assembly. The Ministers are then appointed by the Prime Minister and also approved by the National Assembly.

At the May 20, 2007 election only the Vietnamese Fatherland Front, a front consisting of the Communist Party of Vietnam, mass organizations and affiliated, and some non-partisans were allowed to participate. 1 member is self-nominated and is not a member of the VFF. 42 seats were won by non-party candidates. The president is elected for a five-year term by the parliament.  More than 99% of all candidates were selected by Communist Party and most of them were from their own party. Human rights organizations and activists labeled the country's post-reunification polls as fraudulent show elections in 2016.

Electoral system
The deputies of the National Assembly are elected using a bloc voting system from multi-member electoral units. The National Election Council is the authority which promulgates rules and guidelines for, and oversees, general elections in the country. The nomination process is controlled by the Vietnam Fatherland Front, who holds consultative conferences to narrow down a field of candidates for election. The selection process takes into account factors such as proportional representation from the major regions of the country, gender balance, and the inclusion of ethnic minorities as well as representation of mass organizations. Generally, 90% of seats are directly reserved for the Communist Party of Vietnam, with the remaining 10% reserved for non-party members approved by the Fatherland Front.

Local election
People's Council (Hội đồng Nhân dân) is the local legislature of provinces and municipalities of Vietnam. People in the provinces or municipalities elect a People's Council via a direct system. The number of councilors of People's Council depends on the population of that province or municipality. The People's Council is elected for a five-year term. The Chairman of People's Council is elected from the councilors.

The People's Council elects a People's Committee (Ủy ban Nhân dân) as the executive body, thus an indirect system. The People's Committee consists of a Chairman and a number of commissioners.

The Judge of the People's Court (Tòa án Nhân dân) of each province or municipality is appointed by the Chief Justice of the Supreme People's Court of Vietnam.

Latest elections

Legislative election

See also
Electoral calendar
Electoral system
Politics of Vietnam

References